Saint-Guillaume-Nord is the southernmost unorganized territory in the Lanaudière region of Quebec, Canada, part of the Matawinie Regional County Municipality.

Its only community is the hamlet of Saint-Guillaume-Nord, located at confluence of the Matawin River and Cypress Creek, a dozen miles west of Saint-Michel-des-Saints and just east of the north-east entrance to the Mont-Tremblant National Park.

History
The hamlet of Saint-Guillaume-Nord was formed in the early twentieth century, when some thirty lots were granted for agricultural purposes in the geographic Township of Gouin. A mission was established on January 21, 1916, dedicated to St. William (French: saint Guillaume). This name was most likely chosen to honour Joseph-Guillaume-Laurent Forbes (1865-1940), pastor at Kahnawake and Sainte-Anne-de-Bellevue, bishop of Joliette in 1913, and subsequently Archbishop of Ottawa in 1928. After the closure of the Northwood Lumber Company, the little parish went into decline since the soil was of too poor quality to meet the former expectations.

Demographics

Population

Private dwellings occupied by usual residents: 64 (total dwellings: 153)

Language
Mother tongue:
 English as first language: 0%
 French as first language: 100%
 English and French as first language: 0%
 Other as first language: 0%

See also
List of unorganized territories in Quebec

References

Unorganized territories in Lanaudière
Matawinie Regional County Municipality